Anatoli Andreyevich Kim (born 15 June 1939) is a Russian-language writer.

Background
Kim's father was a Soviet Korean, the son of a man who immigrated to the Russian Far East in 1908; his mother was of Russian ethnicity. He claims to be a descendant of 15th-century Korean author Kim Si-seup. He was born in Sergievka, Tulkibas District, Chimkent Oblast, Kazakh Soviet Socialist Republic (today South Kazakhstan Province, Kazakhstan) and spent his early years there. In 1948, his family moved to the Russian Far East and Sakhalin, where he lived until 1957 before entering an art school in Moscow.

Translations
Aside from his original works, Kim has also translated a number of Kazakh language works into Russian, including Abdijamil Nurpeisov's Last Duty (Последний долг) and Mukhtar Auezov's Path of Abay (a re-translation, to replace an older Soviet-era version perceived as insufficient).

Selected works

Notes

Sources

Further reading

1939 births
Living people
People from Shymkent
Koryo-saram
Kazakhstani people of Korean descent
Kazakhstani people of Russian descent
Russian-language writers
Kazakhstani translators
Kazakhstani speculative fiction writers
Translators from Kazakh
Translators to Russian
Converts to Christianity
Soviet people of Korean descent
Maxim Gorky Literature Institute alumni